Lately is a song by American singer Tyrese Gibson. It was written by Gibson and Derek Allen for his self-titled debut studio album (1998), while production was overseen by Allen. "Lately" was released as the third and final single from Tyrese. it featured actress Maia Campbell for the second time after her   previous appearance from the single Sweet Lady. It released reached number 56 on the US Billboard Hot 100 and number 12 on the US Hot R&B/Hip-Hop Songs chart. Tyrese performed the song at Music Mania in 1999.

Track listings

Credits and personnel

 Derek Allen – production, writer
 Chris Baily – recording
 Vernon Blake – recording
 Tyrese Gibson – vocals, writer

 Steve Macmillan – recording
 Bill Meyers – strings
 Gerard Smerek – mixing 
 Juanita Wynn – backing vocals

Charts

Weekly charts

Year-end charts

Anita Baker version

Anita Baker released a cover version of "Lately" to much acclaim on August 7, 2012. In 2013, Baker received a Grammy Award nomination for Best Traditional R&B Performance.

Charts
"Lately" debuted at number 10 on the Urban Adult Contemporary radio chart, the highest debut in the last 15 years.

Weekly charts

Year-end charts

References

1999 singles
Tyrese Gibson songs
2012 singles
Anita Baker songs
Songs written by Tyrese Gibson
1998 songs
RCA Records singles
Blue Note Records singles
Soul ballads
Contemporary R&B ballads
1990s ballads